Tembu Royals FC is a South African football (soccer) club based in Mthatha suburb of the city of Eastern Cape that plays in the Vodacom League.

The team was founded in 1930.

Stadium
Currently the team plays at the 2000 capacity Rotary Stadium (South Africa).

2013 First team squad

References

External links
Nedbank
Soccerway
Goal

Soccer clubs in South Africa
SAFA Second Division clubs
Association football clubs established in 1930